"I Have the Touch" is a song by English rock musician Peter Gabriel from his fourth eponymous studio album released in 1982. The song's working title during the recording sessions was "Hands". This song was featured in the film The Chocolate War (1988). The 1996 remix was used in the film Phenomenon of the same year. In 1996, Heather Nova recorded a cover version of the song for the teen-witch horror film The Craft.

The B-side of the single, "Across the River", was an instrumental which came from a session between Gabriel, Stewart Copeland, L. Shankar, and long-time Gabriel guitarist David Rhodes, recorded for on a WOMAD benefit album, Music and Rhythm, that had been released six months earlier. The track would appear again on other singles, and a live version would appear on the album Secret World Live released in 1994.

1983 version
In 1983, Gabriel and Peter Walsh re-recorded the track featuring an extended instrumental section, first released as a B-side to the 12" single of "Walk Through the Fire", a non-album track from the motion picture Against All Odds in 1984. An edited remix of this version was later released on the 12" single of "Sledgehammer" and the 1990 compilation album Shaking the Tree: Sixteen Golden Greats.

Personnel 
 Peter Gabriel – lead and backing vocals, Fairlight CMI, Prophet-5, Linn LM-1 programming 
 Larry Fast – Prophet-5, Moog synthesizer
 David Rhodes – electric guitar
 Tony Levin – Chapman Stick
 Jerry Marotta – drums
 John Ellis – backing vocals

1996 version
In 1996, Gabriel remixed "I Have the Touch" with Robbie Robertson for the movie Phenomenon. For the first time, the song charted. This version was released on the 2003 compilation album Hit.

References

1982 singles
1982 songs
Peter Gabriel songs
British new wave songs
Charisma Records singles
Geffen Records singles
Songs written by Peter Gabriel